Poédogo may refer to: 

Poédogo, Bazèga (disambiguation)
Poédogo, Doulougou
Poédogo, Kombissiri
Poédogo, Ganzourgou